The Bard (1883–1907) was an American Champion Thoroughbred racehorse. He was the most popular horse of his day and one who raced and beat many leading American horses.

Background
Bred by Charles Reed, owner of the Fairview Stud Farm in Gallatin, Tennessee, his dam was Bradamante and his sire was the U.S. Racing Hall of Famne inductee, Longfellow, who was the Leading sire in North America sixteen times between 1861 and 1878. The Bard was purchased and raced by Alexander Cassatt, President of the Pennsylvania Railroad, and, in racing, the owner of Chesterbrook Farm in Berwyn, Pennsylvania and President of Monmouth Park Racetrack. He was trained by John Huggins.

Racing career
The Bard raced at age two in 1885, notably winning the Red Bank Stakes at Monmouth Park, the Bouquet Stakes at Sheepshead Bay Race Track, and the Capital Stakes at the Ivy City Racetrack in Washington, D.C.

As a three-year-old, The Bard developed into a top competitor. In the pre-United States Triple Crown era, he won the 1886 Preakness Stakes and finished second in the Belmont Stakes. The following year, The Bard's performances led to his being recognized as the best Older Male in America in 1887, despite missing much of the second half of the year with a life-threatening illness. His popularity at the time was such that regular bulletins of his condition were released and published by major newspapers across the country.

Recovered from his illness, The Bard returned to dominate American racing in the first half of 1888. In a much anticipated event, on May 15 he defeated Hanover to win the 1888 Brooklyn Handicap. Eleven days later on May 26, The Bard met Hanover again in the 1½ mile Brooklyn Cup at Gravesend Race Track on Coney Island.The field also included Lucky Baldwin's highly regarded California colt, Volante. The following day's New York Times headline was "The Bard Wins The Cup; He Is America's Greatest Race Horse". The Bard lost his only race of 1888 when he injured a hind leg in the August 2, 1888, Freehold Stakes, which was won by Firenze at Long Branch Racetrack. On April 4, 1889, the New York Times reported that: "The Bard may not be seen on the turf again this year, owing to the trouble with his leg, which caused him to stop racing suddenly last year." Although his owner hoped he might recover in time to compete in the Brooklyn Derby and Suburban Handicap, the injury was serious enough that he would never race again.

From 1885 through 1888, The Bard won 27 races and earned $84,990.

Stud career
On May 16, 1889 the Times again wrote that The Bard had still not raced and later reports show him standing at stud at his owner's Pennsylvania breeding farm.

The mainstay of Alexander Cassat's horse breeding operation, and after his death in 1906, for his son Edward, The Bard sired a number of successful runners including Gold Heels, the 1902 American Champion Older Male Horse, and the filly, Poetess, winner of the 1897 Alabama Stakes.

The Bard died in 1907.

Pedigree

References

1883 racehorse births
1907 racehorse deaths
Racehorses bred in Tennessee
Racehorses trained in the United States
American Champion racehorses
Preakness Stakes winners
Thoroughbred family 12-b